Geyserville  (formerly Clairville) is an unincorporated community and census-designated place (CDP) in Sonoma County, California, USA. Located in the Wine Country, Geyserville has a small selection of restaurants, bed and breakfasts, and wineries. Geyserville is located on California State Route 128, close to US Route 101. The population was 862 at the 2010 census.

History

Geyserville, located on the Rancho Tzabaco Mexican land grant, owes its foundation to the discovery in 1847 of a series of hot springs, fumaroles, and steam vents in a gorge in the mountains of Sonoma County, California, between Calistoga and Cloverdale.  This complex, which became known as The Geysers, soon became a tourist attraction, and a settlement grew up to provide accommodation and serve as a gateway to The Geysers.  It was initially known as Clairville but subsequently renamed Geyserville.  After the San Francisco and North Pacific Railroad was extended to Cloverdale in the 1870s, its trains stopped in Geyserville.

Geography
According to the United States Census Bureau, the CDP covers an area of 4.6 square miles (11.9 km), all of it land.

Demographics

At the 2010 census Geyserville had a population of 862, although the official sign at the entrance to the town says "1,600" on August 8, 2014. The racial makeup of Geyserville was 609 (70.6%) White, 5 (0.6%) African American, 7 (0.8%) Native American, 14 (1.6%) Asian, 0 (0.01%) Pacific Islander, 192 (22.3%) from other races, and 35 (4.1%) from two or more races. Hispanic or Latino of any race were 328 people (38.1%).

The census reported that 98.5% of the population lived in households and 1.5% lived in non-institutionalized group quarters.

There were 298 households, 108 (36.2%) had children under the age of 18 living in them, 169 (56.7%) were opposite-sex married couples living together, 26 (8.7%) had a female householder with no husband present, 22 (7.4%) had a male householder with no wife present.  There were 22 (7.4%) unmarried opposite-sex partnerships, and 2 (0.7%) same-sex married couples or partnerships. 51 households (17.1%) were one person and 14 (4.7%) had someone living alone who was 65 or older. The average household size was 2.85.  There were 217 families (72.8% of households); the average family size was 3.17.

The age distribution was 201 people (23.3%) under the age of 18, 71 people (8.2%) aged 18 to 24, 213 people (24.7%) aged 25 to 44, 293 people (34.0%) aged 45 to 64, and 84 people (9.7%) who were 65 or older.  The median age was 39.9 years. For every 100 females, there were 116.0 males.  For every 100 females age 18 and over, there were 122.6 males.

The homeowner vacancy rate was 1.7%; the rental vacancy rate was 0%. 55.7% of the population lived in owner-occupied housing units and 42.8% lived in rental housing units.

Transportation
Geyserville Avenue carries the designation of California State Route 128 until it routes along U.S. Route 101 to the north. The Northwestern Pacific right-of-way is expected to be reactivated for Sonoma–Marin Area Rail Transit service when the line is rebuilt to Cloverdale, but Geyserville is not planned to receive a stop.

See also
 Northwestern Pacific Railroad
 Wine Country

References

External links
 Geyserville Chamber of Commerce
 Northern Sonoma County Fire

Census-designated places in Sonoma County, California
Census-designated places in California